The canton of Annonay-1 is an administrative division of the Ardèche department, southern France. It was created at the French canton reorganisation which came into effect in March 2015. Its seat is in Annonay.

It consists of the following communes:
 
Annonay (partly)
Boulieu-lès-Annonay
Davézieux
Saint-Clair
Saint-Cyr
Saint-Marcel-lès-Annonay
Savas

References

Cantons of Ardèche